Otley Rugby Union Football Club is an English rugby union club representing Otley in the City of Leeds, district of West Yorkshire. The club runs two senior teams – the first XV, the Saracens (2nd XV), as well as a full range of junior teams. The first XV play in National League 2 North.

History
Otley RUFC was founded in 1865 but broke away from rugby union in 1900 to become a rugby league club. They disbanded in 1906 and reformed as a rugby union club in 1907, the ground being at Wharfeside.  In 1909–10 they won the Yorkshire Challenge Cup. Play was suspended during the First World War, but started again in 1919, and on 28 September 1921 they moved to a new and better ground at Cross Green, Otley.

In the 2007–08 season they won the National Division Two title securing an immediate return to National Division One having been relegated the previous season, however they were immediately relegated again in the 2008–09 season along with fellow promoted side Manchester and three other teams due to the new professionalised format of National Division One (now the RFU Championship). Two seasons later the club was relegated again, this time to National League 2 North. The all-time leading try scorer is James Twomey, with 74 in 107 appearances between 2009 and 2013.

In 1979 the stadium was the site of a famous victory by the North of England against the New Zealand ″All Blacks″. The Wallabies suffered the same fate in October, 1988. Cross Green hosted one group game of the 1991 Rugby World Cup, between the United States and Italy which was won by Italy 30–9.

Notable former players

 Alfred "Alf" Bateson (England 1930)
Danny Care
 Albert Fert, (winner of 2007 Nobel Prize for Physics) 
 Arthur Gray (Fullback for England while at Otley RUFC in 1947 against Wales, Ireland, and Scotland)
 Frank Malir (England 1930)
 Leslie Manfield (Wales 1938)
 Nigel Melville
 Jimmy Keinhorst

Honours
 Yorkshire Challenge Cup winners (9 times): 1889, 1910, 1911, 1929, 1931, 1934, 1936, 1937, 1993
 North Division 1 champions: 1989–90
 Courage League - Division 4 North champions: 1990–91
 National League 1 champions (3): 1992–93, 1999–00, 2007–08

Current standings

References

External links
 Official website

English rugby union teams
Rugby clubs established in 1865
Sport in Leeds
Otley
Rugby union in Yorkshire